Naum Mironovich Olev (February 22, 1939, Moscow, USSR - April 10, 2009, Moscow, Russia) was a Russian  lyricist of Jewish origin who penned the songs for Mary Poppins, Goodbye (1983) and Treasure Island (1988), among many other Soviet musical films.

Russian male poets
1939 births
2009 deaths
Russian Jews
20th-century Russian poets
20th-century Russian male writers